Shizue Yamaguchi (31 October 1917 – 3 April 2012) was a Japanese physician and politician. She was one of the first group of women elected to the House of Representatives in 1946.

Biography

After World War II, Yamaguchi joined the Japan Socialist Party. Sponsored by Toyohiko Kagawa, she was a JSP candidate in Tokyo 1st district in the 1946 general elections, the first in which women could vote, and was elected to the House of Representatives. She was re-elected in 1947 and 1949. When the JSP split, she joined the Rightist Socialist Party and was re-elected in 1952, 1953 and 1955. After the JSP re-united, she was re-elected in 1958, 1960, 1963 and 1967. Following the 1967 elections she left the JSP and joined the Liberal Democratic Party. Although she lost her seat in the 1972 elections (by which time she was the last remaining member of the first intake of female MPs), she was returned to office in the 1976 elections and re-elected in 1979, serving in the House until 1980. She retired from politics after the 1983 elections.

In 1980 Yamaguchi received the United Nations Peace Medal. In 1987 she was made a member of the Order of the Sacred Treasure. She died of renal failure in 2012.

References

1917 births
20th-century Japanese women politicians
20th-century Japanese politicians
Members of the House of Representatives (Japan)
Social Democratic Party (Japan) politicians
Rightist Socialist Party of Japan politicians
Liberal Democratic Party (Japan) politicians
Recipients of the Order of the Sacred Treasure
2012 deaths